Arcipelago Toscano National Park is a large Tuscan Archipelago national park and marine park in the Provinces of Grosseto and Livorno, western Tuscany, Italy.

Geography
The Tuscan archipelago (chain of islands) is located between the Ligurian Sea (north) and Tyrrhenian Sea (south), in the Mediterranean Sea.

The Arcipelago Toscano National Park includes the seven main islands (isola) of the Tuscan Archipelago:
 Elba
 Isola del Giglio
 Capraia
 Montecristo
 Pianosa
 Giannutri
 Gorgona
 and some of the minor islands and rock outcrops.

Costa Concordia mess

In January 2012, captain Francesco Schettino crashed the Costa Concordia ship into some rocks in the park. The ship was stuck until about 2013.

See also
 List of national parks of Italy

Notes

References
 Yearbook of the Italian Parks 2005; edited by Comunicazione in association with Federparchi and the Italian State Tourism Board; .

External links

 Official Parco Nazionale Arcipelago Toscano website—

 
Marine parks of Italy
National parks of Italy
Parks in Tuscany
Province of Livorno
Ligurian Sea
Tyrrhenian Sea